Odozana inconspicua is a moth of the subfamily Arctiinae. It was described by Schaus in 1911 and can be found in Costa Rica.

References

Lithosiini
Moths described in 1911